ODAM or Odam  may refer to:
ODAM (gene)
Organisation of Development, Action and Maintenance, Indian NGO
International Strategic Research Organization, Turkish think-tank

People
Girolamo Odam (1681- after 1718), Italian painter
Dorothy Tyler-Odam (1920-2014), British athlete
John Odam (born 1943), American lawyer and politician
Norman Carl Odam (born 1947), American performer known as the Legendary Stardust Cowboy

See also
Odams